The Lake Pierre-Paul  is located at Saint-Tite in Mékinac Regional County Municipality, in the administrative region of Mauricie, in the province of Quebec, Canada. This lake is part of the Batiscanie watershed. From St. Joseph Boulevard in Saint-Tite, taking the road of Lake Pierre-Paul (along the CN railroad), just browse 1.4 km to cross (on the right) the road "Petit Pierre-Paul", 2.2 km to reach the lake Pierre-Paul, 2.4 km to reach the intersection of "chemin de l'île" (Road island), and 3.6 km to the corner of the road that branches off to the right (Saint-Adelphe) and crosses the railway.

The lake is bordered on the northwest by the route of the CNR Railway, which connects Saint-Tite and Sainte-Thècle. Lake Pierre-Paul Road and a road used to go around the lake. Lake Pierre-Paul is characterized by an island (shaped as a moccasin) located in the center and accessible via a bridge connecting it to the north shore. The surface of the lake is 150 meters above sea level. Its mouth is located in the north-east of the lake and outlet flows into a small lake. The outlet of this small lake is the Pierre-Paul River whose path is shaped like a giant "Z", flowing straight north into Sainte-Thècle and Saint-Adelphe.

Today, the area around the Pierre-Paul lake is characterized by its highly developed resort. The area north of Pierre-Paul lake had been cleared at the end of the XIXth and early XXth, then soil cultivation has been abandoned for reforestation. Formerly, the Charest road (designated as a tribute to Florent Charest, whose family lived in Sainte-Thècle at the corner of St Thomas Road and Rompré road), the road linking St Thomas Road to Pierre-Paul lake (in Saint-Tite), a segment of about 1.2 km from the road was abandoned in the 1970s, starting with lake Road Pierre-Paul.

Toponymy 
According to one theory, the origin of the name and the "Pierre-Paul" lake and "Pierre-Paul River" would be linked to an Indian family, called Pierre-Paul, who lived near Pierre-Paul lake. In the early 1870s, the place name "Pierre-Paul" meant a locality in the area of the mouth of the said river. This locality became the nucleus of the parish of Saint-Adelphe (south-west of the Batiscan River), but the church was subsequently built in front of the mouth, on the other side.

The names "Pierre-Paul lake" and "Pierre-Paul River" were officially registered in the register of the Commission de toponymie du Québec on December 5, 1968. While the toponym "Bras de la rivière Pierre-Paul (Arm of Pierre-Paul River)" (the largest tributary of the Pierre-Paul River) was placed on the register on 18 December 1979 as a "stream".

See also 

 Batiscanie
 Pierre-Paul River
 Batiscan River
 Rivière des Envies
 Mekinac Regional County Municipality (RCM)
 Saint-Tite
 Sainte-Thècle
 Saint-Adelphe

References 

Lakes of Mauricie
Mékinac Regional County Municipality